The Lunar and Planetary Institute (LPI) is a scientific research institute dedicated to study of the solar system, its formation, evolution, and current state. The Institute is part of the Universities Space Research Association (USRA) and is supported by the Science Mission Directorate of the National Aeronautics and Space Administration (NASA). Located at 3600 Bay Area Boulevard in Houston, Texas, the LPI maintains an extensive collection of lunar and planetary data, carries out education and public outreach programs, and offers meeting coordination and publishing services. The LPI sponsors and organizes several workshops and conferences throughout the year, including the Lunar and Planetary Science Conference (LPSC) held in March in the Houston area.

History 
In his March 1968 speech at the Manned Spacecraft Center (MSC) in Houston, Texas, President Lyndon B. Johnson announced the formation of the Lunar Science Institute (LSI).

"We will welcome here all who are interested in the sciences of space. We will strengthen the cooperation between NASA and our universities. And we will set new patterns of scientific cooperation which will have profound effects on man's knowledge of his universe."
-- President Lyndon B. Johnson, March 1, 1968

"The institute will provide a base for outside scientists, encouraging them to visit the Manned Spacecraft Center and use its laboratories, lunar photographs, and (ultimately) its rock samples. LSI is viewed as a major potential stimulus to lunar science at MSC and elsewhere."

This announcement was the culmination of meetings and events involving NASA, the National Academy of Sciences, Universities Research Association and several major universities. Initially operated by the National Academy of Sciences, USRA took over the management of the Lunar Science Institute on December 11, 1969.

William W. Rubey was appointed the first director of the Lunar Science Institute. Rubey led the institute through the transition to the new management operation under USRA. A program of visiting university-based scientists was established, the first symposium was organized, and the first lecture of the LSI seminar series was presented.  The Lunar Science Institute was formally dedicated on January 4, 1970, at the former West Mansion on NASA Road 1 near the Manned Spacecraft Center.

Thomas R. McGetchin was appointed director in 1977. Under his leadership, McGetchin expanded the focus of the Lunar Science Institute to include the study of the entire Solar System, and the name was changed to the Lunar and Planetary Institute.

In 1991, under the leadership of David C. Black, the LPI moved into a new facility. This new building combined several USRA divisions and operations into one location.  The building, dedicated in January 1992, provided more office, meeting, computer and library space and improved USRA-Houston operations.

Science

General focus 
Research topics of the LPI include the formation and evolution of the Solar System, petrology and geochemistry of planetary materials and volatiles, planetary interiors, volcanism, tectonism, and impact cratering.  Research interests range from Mercury to Pluto and the icy moons of the Solar System.

The LPI currently maintains a staff of resident scientists as well as visiting scientists, postdoctoral fellows, and graduate fellows. Resident scientists provide planetary science expertise necessary for the LPI to achieve its goals and maintain their scientific proficiency through peer-reviewed activities.

The Center for Lunar Science and Exploration, a collaborative effort of the Lunar and Planetary Institute and the Johnson Space Center and an integral part of the Solar System Exploration Research Virtual Institute (SSERVI) (formerly the NASA Lunar Science Institute), was established in 2009. The Center is designed to develop a core, multi-institutional lunar science program, provide scientific and technical expertise to NASA, support the development of a lunar science community, and develop lunar science education and outreach programs.

Analysis groups 
The LPI provides support for a number of NASA's community analysis groups, including:

Curation and Analysis Planning Team for Extraterrestrial Materials (CAPTEM) - responsible for the care and distribution of all extraterrestrial samples collected by NASA including the Apollo lunar samples, materials from sample return missions, and solid materials of the Solar System

Lunar Exploration Analysis Group (LEAG) - responsible for analyzing scientific, technical, commercial, and operational issues associated with lunar exploration in response to requests by NASA

Mars Exploration Program Analysis Group (MEPAG) - responsible for providing science input for planning and prioritizing future Mars exploration activities for the next several decades

Outer Planets Assessment Group (OPAG) - responsible for identifying the scientific priorities and pathways for exploration in the outer Solar System

Optimizing Science and Exploration Working Group (OSEWG) - responsible for guiding exploration and science investigations during lunar sortie and outpost missions, with extensibility to future Mars missions

Small Bodies Assessment Group (SBAG) - responsible for identifying scientific priorities and opportunities for the exploration of asteroids, comets, interplanetary dust, small satellites, and trans-Neptunian objects and for providing scientific input on the utility of asteroids and comets in support of human space activities

Venus Exploration Analysis Group (VEXAG) - responsible for identifying scientific priorities and strategy for the exploration of Venus

Mapping and Planetary Spatial Infrastructure Team  (MAPSIT) - ensuring that planetary data are usable for any purpose, now and in the future

Summer intern programs 
The LPI hosts a Summer Intern Program providing undergraduates an opportunity to participate in cutting-edge research in the planetary sciences. LPI Summer Interns work one-on-one with scientists at the LPI or at the Johnson Space Center to complete research projects of current interest. The Summer Intern Program allows participants to experience a real research environment, to learn from leading planetary scientists, and to preview careers in research.

From 2008 through 2013, the LPI also hosted a Lunar Exploration Summer Intern Program designed to evaluate possible landing sites for robotic and human exploration missions. Interns worked with LPI scientific staff and other collaborators. The program was open to graduate students in geology, planetary science, and related fields, and undergraduates with at least 50 semester hours of credit. In 2015, a new Exploration Science Summer Intern Program was established, building on the success of the previous program, but with a broader scope that includes both the Moon and near-Earth asteroids.

Meetings 

The LPI organizes and sponsors a number of planetary science workshops and conferences throughout the year in both domestic and international locations, including the annual Lunar and Planetary Science Conference. This important five-day meeting held in the Houston area in March brings together international specialists in petrology, geochemistry, geophysics, geology, and astronomy to present scientific findings in planetary science. The LPSC dates back to the days of the Apollo program and the early meetings focusing on the study of the lunar samples. After over 50 years, this conference continues to thrive, drawing planetary scientists and researchers from around the world.

Publications 

The LPI has collaborated on a number of publications in the prestigious Space Science Series of the University of Arizona Press, including Asteroids III, Comets II, Europa, Meteorites and the Early Solar System II, Origin of the Earth and Moon, Protostars and Planets V, The Solar System Beyond Neptune, and Comparative Climatology of Terrestrial Planets. The LPI also publishes a large number of planetary science workshop and meeting documents every year as well as a quarterly newsletter, Lunar and Planetary Information Bulletin. Since June 2014, eighteen lunar and planetary science books, most published by LPI such as Traces of Catastrophe and Lunar Stratigraphy and Sedimentology,  have been available online.

Education and public outreach 

The LPI has a long tradition of space science education and public outreach through a number of programs and resources. This effort serves a wide variety of audiences, including K-12 students and educators, undergraduate, graduate, and postgraduate students, and the public in formal and informal venues and on local, regional, and national levels.

These programs and resources include the following:

Explore! Fun with Science - a program designed to bring space science into libraries and informal learning environments

SkyFest -  a series of free programs open to all ages that offers night sky viewing opportunities and hands-on activities about four times a year

Cosmic Explorations: A Speakers Series - a series of free public lectures presented by international experts in space science (past lectures are made available online at the LPI website)

Library 
The LPI library contains more than 60,000 cataloged books, documents, maps, films and videos, and print and electronic journals and newsletters. The subject emphasis of the collection is planetary science and geology, with limited collection development extending into the secondary support field of computer science remote sensing. There is an ongoing effort to scan and make available to the scientific community and the general public a number of out-of-print planetary science books, NASA documents and images, and related works. (These publications are copyright-free or made available with permission.)

This collection was a NASA Regional Planetary Image Facility (RPIF) and includes photographs, maps, and other data from planetary missions including Apollo, Lunar Orbiter, Clementine, Mars Pathfinder, Voyager 1, Voyager 2, Magellan, Galileo, and Mars Global Surveyor.

Directors of the LPI

 William Walden Rubey (1968-1971)
 Joseph W. Chamberlain (1971-1973)
 David W. Strangway (1973)
 James W. Head (1973-1974)
 Robert O. Pepin (1974-1977)
 Thomas R. McGetchin (1977-1979)
 John R. Sevier (1979)
 Roger J. Phillips (1979-1982)
Kevin C. Burke (1982-1988)
 David C. Black (1988-2002)
 Arch M. Reid (2002)
 Stephen J. Mackwell (2002–2016)
 Louise Prockter (2016–2020)
 Lisa Gaddis (2020–present)

References 

Research institutes in Texas
NASA groups, organizations, and centers
Organizations based in Houston
Lunar and Planetary Institute